Copelatus malaisei is a species of diving beetle. It is part of the genus Copelatus, which is in the subfamily Copelatinae of the family Dytiscidae. It was described by Félix Guignot in 1954.

References

malaisei
Beetles described in 1954